George Michael Coupland FRS (born 20 December 1959, in Dumfries) is a Scottish plant scientist, and Research Scientist and Director of the Max Planck Institute for Plant Breeding Research.

Education
Coupland earned a First Class Honours from University of Glasgow in 1981, and PhD from University of Edinburgh in 1984.

Career and research
He was postdoctoral researcher at University of Cologne from 1985 to 1988.
He was Research Group Leader at the Plant Breeding Institute, University of Cambridge, from 1989 to 1990.
He was Research Group Leader at the John Innes Centre, from 1990 to 2001.

With Liam Dolan, Nicholas Harberd, Alison Mary Smith, Cathie Martin, Jonathan D. G. Jones, Robert Sablowski and Abigail Amey he is a co-author of the undergraduate textbook Plant Biology.

Awards and honours
Coupland was elected a Fellow of the Royal Society in May 2007 and a foreign associate of the National Academy of Sciences in May 2012.

Personal life
He is married to British botanist Jane E. Parker.

References

1959 births
Living people
Alumni of the University of Glasgow
Alumni of the University of Edinburgh
Academics of the University of East Anglia
Members of the European Molecular Biology Organization
Fellows of the Royal Society
Foreign associates of the National Academy of Sciences
People from Dumfries
Max Planck Institute directors